Alla is a surname. Notable people with the surname include:

Albi Alla (born 1993), Albanian footballer
Hassane Alla (born 1980), Moroccan footballer
Alla Kali Krishna Das, Indian politician
Myslym Alla (1919–1999), Albanian footballer and manager
Alla Ramakrishna Reddy, Indian politician

See also
Allas